Music Is Medicine is the tenth studio solo album by American country music singer Marie Osmond, released on April 15, 2016, on OliveMe Records. It is her first studio album released on her private label OliveMe, LLC. It was released on both CD and digital download through big box stores and major music download services.

Background
This is Osmond's first new album in five years. The album was produced by Jason Deere whom she has worked with in the past. Additional guest artist are Marty Roe, Olivia Newton-John, Sisqó, John Rich and Alex Boyé.

The album was produced by Jason Deere, who did not produce any of Osmond's previous albums. Jerry Crutchfield produced her final country album in 1989 and Paul Worley produced her previous three under the Capitol/Curb label during the late 1980s. Music Is Medicine is Osmond's final country album to date.

The album was recorded at Soundstage Studios and Westwood Studios - both in Nashville, TN, Additional studios used were Audio Mix House and Studios at The Palms in Las Vegas, NV.  The album was mastered by Silvio Richetto at The Living Room Studios in Aventura, FL.

The album entered the Billboard Top Country Albums chart at number 10 on May 7, 2016. It has sold 8,000 copies in the US as of May 31, 2016.

Vinyl
A limited edition autographed vinyl pressing of the album was released by the online retailer Amazon on November 18, 2016.  Marie autographed each of the album covers prior to shipment as shown in photographs on both her Facebook and Instagram accounts.  As of November 22, 2016 the autographed versions of the vinyl were no longer in stock and no additional copies will be pressed.

Track listing

Music videos
On March 27, 2016 a video for the song "Then There's You" was released on the internet video site Vevo and it received almost 200,000 views in less than 48 hours. On April 13, 2016 the video for the title track was also released on Vevo and was filmed with patients from Children's Miracle Network Hospitals.

Personnel
 Jeremy Barron – production assistant
 David LaBruyere – bass
 Dave Cohen – keys
 Jason Deere – background vocals
 David Dorn – keys
 Cheaza Figueroa – background vocals
 Lee Hendricks – bass
 Brad Hull – Production Assistant
 Evan Hutchins – drums
 Rachael Lauren – background vocals
 Tasha Layton – background vocals
 Miles McPherson – drums
 Justin Ostrander – electric guitar
 Justin Richards – background vocals
 Silvio Richetto – background vocals
 Adam Shoenfeld – electric guitar
 Russel Terrell – background vocals
 Ilya Toshinskiy – acoustic, banjo, mandolin, electric guitar
 Briana Tyson – background vocals

Chart performance

Album

Singles

References

2016 albums
Marie Osmond albums
Albums produced by Jason Deere